Elections to the European Parliament were held in Belgium on 12 June 1994. The Dutch-speaking electoral college elected 14 MEPs, the French-speaking electoral college elected 10 MEPs and the German-speaking electoral college elected 1 MEP.

Results 

Belgium
European Parliament elections in Belgium
1994 elections in Belgium